I Predict a Clone: A Steve Taylor Tribute is a various artists album released in 1994. The album is a tribute to the Christian music artist Steve Taylor.

The music is in a variety of styles which generally reflect the artist which recorded the track. Taylor himself took no part in the production of the project, and opted to donate all proceeds to Jesus People USA. He also stated that he liked the new versions better than his own, and in later concerts he began emulating the reworked styles of some songs.

Track listing

References

Steve Taylor tribute albums
1994 compilation albums
Contemporary Christian music compilation albums